Keith Drury (born 1945) is an Associate Professor of Religion at Indiana Wesleyan University. Drury spent more than twenty years (1971-1988, 1990-1996) in denominational leadership for the Wesleyan Church. As a writer through 2010, he spoke to pastors and church leaders on a variety of popular and scholarly ministry topics and is perhaps best known for his Tuesday Column blog, a series of articles published weekly since 1995 targeted towards Wesleyan pastors and church leaders.

References

External links

Arminian ministers
Arminian theologians
1945 births
Living people
Indiana Wesleyan University faculty
Princeton Theological Seminary